Gillian Coultard  (born 22 July 1963) is an English former football player, and former England captain. She is one of England Women's most capped internationals, with 119 appearances, and was the highest capped outfield England international ever until Rachel Yankey reached 120 caps in 2012. At the time she was one of only five footballers (Bobby Moore, Billy Wright, Bobby Charlton and Peter Shilton were the others) to have reached over 100 caps for England, and she was the first woman and amateur player to have done so.

Club career
At club level, Coultard won two National League titles and six FA Women's Cup finals during 24 years with Doncaster Belles. Joining as a 13-year-old schoolgirl, she eventually made over 300 appearances and became a key player in the side which dominated women's football in England. She retired from club football at the end of the 2000–01 season, making an emotional farewell appearance for the Belles against Charlton Athletic in May 2001.

Coultard fitted in four training sessions and a match every week, despite her full–time job on the production line at a Pioneer factory in Castleford. She used her annual leave from work to play for England and rejected several offers to join semi-professional clubs in Belgium, Italy, Sweden and Finland.

International career
Coultard, a midfielder initially, though moving back to sweeper towards the end of her career, made her international debut in a 3–1 win over the Republic of Ireland in 1981, at the age of 18. She went on to score 30 goals at international level, a rate of one every four games, including a pair in England's first ever World Cup finals match, a 3–2 win over Canada in Sweden, in 1995. England were knocked out at the quarter-final stage by eventual tournament runners-up, Germany. Coultard had also been part of the England squad which finished runners-up to Sweden in the first UEFA final in 1984, losing the final on penalties. Coultard was appointed England captain in 1991 when the previous captain Debbie Bampton was injured. Bampton was restored as captain in 1995, but Coultard regained the captaincy in 1997 when Bampton retired from international football.

Coultard won her 100th England cap in a 4–0 win over Scotland at Almondvale Stadium in August 1997. That October, before a 1999 World Cup qualifier against Holland at Upton Park, she was presented with a silver cap by Sir Geoff Hurst in recognition of the achievement.

In the early stages of England's successful 2001 UEFA Women's Championship qualification campaign Coultard remained captain of the side. Coultard's 119th and final cap came in a 1–0 win over Switzerland in May 2000. She was later a non-playing member of the England side which suffered their record defeat – an 8–0 loss away to Norway in June 2000. In October 2000, 37-year-old Coultard announced her international retirement in order to concentrate on a coaching role in the National Women's Football Academy in Durham.

Post retirement
In May 2005 Coultard was diagnosed with breast cancer, which was successfully treated with surgery, chemotherapy and radium therapy. On 19 October 2006, she was inducted into the English Football Hall of Fame. Coultard managed the new Hartlepool United Ladies team in 2008–09. In 2009, she was offered a role as coach of the Estonia women's national football team, but turned down the offer for personal reasons. After her footballing career, she has served as a warehouse operative at Teva Pharmaceuticals.

Coultard was appointed Member of the Order of the British Empire (MBE) in the 2021 New Year Honours for services to football.

Honours
Doncaster Rovers Belles
 FA Women's Premier League National Division: 1991–92, 1993–94
FA Women's Cup: 1982–83, 1986–87, 1987–88, 1989–90, 1991–92, 1993–94
Mundialito: 1988

Notes

References

External links
Gillian Coultard at The National Football Museum Hall of Fame Pages
"First Female Centurion", Gillian Coultard interview at the FA website
 

Living people
1963 births
People from Thorne, South Yorkshire
Footballers from Doncaster
English women's footballers
Doncaster Rovers Belles L.F.C. players
FA Women's National League players
England women's international footballers
1995 FIFA Women's World Cup players
English Football Hall of Fame inductees
FIFA Century Club
Women's association football defenders
Women's association football midfielders
Members of the Order of the British Empire